Lars Lennart Wernblom (born 23 October 1961) is a Swedish curler.

Teams

References

External links
 

Living people
1961 births
Swedish male curlers